Ectenesseca clavula is a species of beetle in the family Cerambycidae, the only species in the genus Ectenesseca.

References

Ectenessini